Pseudorhizina is a genus of ascomycete fungi related to the false morels of the genus Gyromitra. The type species is Pseudorhizina korshinskii, the genus being erected in 1913. Known as the umbrella false morel, P. californica is a well-known species of western North America.

References

Discinaceae
Pezizales genera